Brunfelsia splendida is a species of plant in the family Solanaceae. It is endemic to Jamaica.

References

splendida
Vulnerable plants
Endemic flora of Jamaica
Taxonomy articles created by Polbot